This article is about the particular significance of the century 1501–1600 to Wales and its people.

Princes of Wales
Arthur (to 2 April 1502)
Henry (later Henry VIII) (1504–1509)

Princesses of Wales
Catherine of Aragon (to 2 April 1502)

Events
1501
2 October - Catherine of Aragon arrives at Plymouth, England, in readiness for her marriage to the Prince of Wales. 
14 November - Arthur, Prince of Wales, marries Catherine of Aragon at St Paul's Cathedral; Catherine thus becomes Princess of Wales.
21 December - The Prince and Princess of Wales leave London for their seat at Ludlow Castle. Sir Richard Pole is among the retinue that accompanies the couple.
1502
March - The Prince and Princess of Wales are both afflicted by an unknown illness, "a malign vapour which proceeded from the air". It would prove fatal for the prince.
4 April - News reaches King Henry VII of England of the death of the Prince of Wales; he is grief-stricken. 
23 April - Three weeks after his sudden death, the body of Arthur, Prince of Wales, is removed from Ludlow Castle and taken to the Parish Church of Ludlow.
25 April - The Prince of Wales is buried at the Abbey of St Wulfstan in Worcester. His widow, Catherine, now Dowager Princess of Wales, is too ill to attend her husband's funeral, suffering from the same mystery illness that is thought to have killed him.
August
William Smyth, Bishop of Lincoln, becomes President of the Council of Wales and the Marches.
King Henry VII of England is believed to have visited Troy House, near Monmouth, the home of Blanche Herbert and her second husband, Sir William Herbert, an illegitimate son of William Herbert, 1st Earl of Pembroke.
1503
25 June - Catherine of Aragon, Dowager Princess of Wales, is formally betrothed to her brother-in-law, Prince Henry. Catherine comes out of mourning.
1504
18 February - Henry, Duke of York, is invested as Prince of Wales.
30 August - John Penny is appointed Bishop of Bangor.
1505
9 May - Sir William Herbert of Troy (illegitimate son of the late Earl of Pembroke) gives an undertaking to keep the peace with his half-brother, Sir Walter Herbert of Raglan (who was brother-in-law of Edward Stafford, 3rd Duke of Buckingham), and with Henry Myles, his brother-in-law (the father of Blanche Parry).
11 May - Robert Sherborne is consecrated Bishop of St David's.
1506
April - The betrothal of Prince Henry to the Dowager Princess of Wales (1503) is declared invalid (Henry's age at the time is used as a pretext).
Construction begins on tower of St Giles' Church, Wrexham.
1507
Restrictions in the borough of Caernarfon are eased: the Welsh are allowed to live inside the town walls.
1508
18 September - Robert Sherborne, Bishop of St David's, is translated to the see of Chichester. St David's remains without a bishop until the following year.
22 September - John Penny, Bishop of Bangor, is translated to the see of Carlisle; Bangor remains without a bishop until the following year.
The lordship of Dyffryn Clwyd is sold to King Henry VII of England by the incumbent Richard Grey, 3rd Earl of Kent.
Chepstow Castle becomes the property of Charles Somerset, 1st Earl of Worcester.
Construction of Hendre'r Ywydd Uchaf farmhouse, now an exhibit at St Fagans National History Museum.
1509
21 April - Following his father's death, the Prince of Wales becomes King Henry VIII of England.
11 June - The new King, Henry VIII, marries the Dowager Princess of Wales, Catherine of Aragon, at Greenwich.
17 June - Thomas Skevington is consecrated Bishop of Bangor.
22 July - Edward Vaughan is consecrated Bishop of St David's.
1510
Elis Gruffydd joins the English army.
1512
Bishop Godfrey Blyth replaces Bishop William Smyth as President of the Council of Wales and the Marches.
1516
Sir Thomas Phillips is appointed High Sheriff of Carmarthenshire.
Sir William Herbert of Troy Parva is knighted; his wife, Blanche Herbert, is thereafter called Lady Troy.
1517
Lady Catherine Gordon marries her third husband, Matthew Craddock, and obtains permission to live with him in Wales when not at court.
1519
Sir John Puleston is granted the lordship of Denbigh and Denbighland by King Henry VIII.
1524
2 December - Chepstow is granted its first charter.
1525
September - Princess Mary, heir to the throne, is sent to Ludlow Castle to preside over the Council of Wales and the Marches. Her retinue includes Susan Clarencieux.
1531
4 December - Rhys ap Gruffudd of Carew Castle is executed for treason.
1534
May - The notoriously anti-Welsh Rowland Lee, newly appointed Bishop of Lichfield, is appointed President of the Council of Wales and the Marches by Thomas Cromwell.
22 July - Henry Somerset is appointed chief justice in eyre of Newport, Wentllwg and Machen.
1536
An Acte for Lawes & Justice to be ministred in Wales in like fourme as it is in this Realme (27 Henry VIII c. 26) "unites" Wales with England and gives Wales parliamentary representation.
Dissolution of the Monasteries - Abergavenny Priory, Basingwerk Abbey, Caldey Island Priory, Chepstow Priory, Cymer Abbey, Ewenny Priory, Grace Dieu Abbey, Haverfordwest Priory, Kidwelly Priory, Llanllugan Abbey, Llanllyr Priory, Margam Abbey, Monmouth Priory, Pill Priory, St Dogmaels Abbey, Strata Marcella Abbey, Talley Abbey and Usk Priory are suppressed
1537
Dissolution of the Monasteries - Bardsey Abbey, Cwmhir Abbey and Valle Crucis Abbey are suppressed.
1538
Dissolution of the Monasteries - Bangor Friary, Beddgelert Priory, Brecon Friary and Brecon Cathedral Priory, Cardiff Blackfriars and Greyfriars, Cardigan Priory, Carmarthen Friary, Denbigh Friary, Haverfordwest Abbey, Llanfaes Friary, Llanthony Priory, Maenan Abbey, Newport Friary, Penrhys Grange and Rhuddlan Friary are suppressed.
1539
Dissolution of the Monasteries - Kidwelly Priory, Malpas Priory, Neath Abbey, Strata Florida Abbey, Tintern Abbey and Whitland Abbey are suppressed.
1540
A Carmarthenshire land dispute becomes the last recorded case to be heard under Welsh law, four years after the 1536 Act stipulated that only English law was to be used in Wales.
1541
Foundation of Christ College, Brecon.
1542
An Acte for certaine Ordinaunces in the Kinges Majesties Domynion and Principalitie of Wales (34 and 35 Henry VIII c. 26) extends the effects of the 1536 Act of Union.
1546
The first printed book in Welsh, the clergy manual Yny lhyvyr hwnn, is published in London; it is written anonymously by Sir John Prise of Brecon.
1550
Walter Devereux is created Viscount Hereford.
1551
10 October - William Herbert is created Baron Herbert of Cardiff.
1553
Nicholas Heath is made President of the Council of Wales and the Marches by Queen Mary I of England.
1557
8 July - The will of Geoffrey Glyn leaves a bequest leading to the foundation of Friars School, Bangor.
1558
November - Thomas Parry, faithful servant of Princess Elizabeth, is made Comptroller of the Household on her accession to the throne, as well as receiving a knighthood.
1559
5 January - Sir Thomas Parry is elected MP for Hertfordshire.
November - George Constantine is made Archdeacon of Brecon.
1563
The new stone bridge over the River Usk at Brecon is built, replacing an earlier structure.
1565
Blanche Parry is appointed Keeper of the Queen's Books and Jewels.
John Beddoes School is founded at Presteigne.
1566
First brass wire drawing works in the British Isles established at Tintern.
Twelve-year-old Philip Sidney is presented by his father, Sir Henry Sidney, to the lay rectory of Whitford, Flintshire, then worth £60 a year.
1568
26 May - A "congress of bards and musicians" takes place at Caerwys, on the orders of a commission appointed by Queen Elizabeth I of England.
1570
John Caius, in his book De Canibus Britannicis, describes Welsh Springer Spaniels as "Spaniels whose skynnes are white and if marked with any spottes they are commonly red".
1571
27 June - Foundation of Jesus College, Oxford, by David Lewis.
1573
First publication of Humphrey Llwyd's Cambriae Typus in the Theatrum Orbis Terrarum (Antwerp); the earliest map of Wales.
1574
Re-foundation of Ruthin School by Gabriel Goodman.
1576
The route for the weekly post to Ireland established by Queen Elizabeth I is switched from Liverpool to Holyhead.
1577
21 April - Mary Sidney marries Henry Herbert, 2nd Earl of Pembroke.
1578
Maurice Clenock becomes Warden of the English College, Rome.
1584
23 September - Robert Sidney marries heiress Barbara Gamage, at St Donat's Castle, the home of her guardian Sir Edward Stradling.
Copper-working begins at Aberdulais Falls.
1587
14 April - A clandestine Roman Catholic printing press is discovered in a cave on the Little Orme on the north coast where it has been used by the recusant Robert Pugh (squire of Penrhyn Hall) and his chaplain Father William Davies to print Y Drych Cristianogawl ("The Christian Mirror"), the first book to be printed in Wales.
1588
Bishop William Morgan's Bible translation into Welsh, Y Bibl Cyssegr-lan, is published.
1589
A blast furnace at Angelton (or Angleton) in the Ogmore Valley.
1595
February - A riot breaks out in Cardiff as the result of the activities of Sir William Herbert (a relative of the Earl of Pembroke) and his henchmen.  
1596
Sir William and Nicholas Herbert are convicted by the Court of Star Chamber, gaoled in the Fleet Prison, and fined 1000 marks for their part in the previous year's affair.
1597
10 November - Richard Vaughan is enthroned as Bishop of Chester.
date unknown
William Herbert becomes MP for Montgomeryshire. 
William Maurice is re-elected MP for Carnarvonshire.
Sir James Perrot becomes MP for Haverfordwest

Arts and literature

Books
1502
Rhys Nanmor - Elegy on the death of Arthur, Prince of Wales
1540
Robert Recorde - 
1542
Andrew Boorde - 
1546
Sir John Price -  (first Welsh language book to be printed)
1547
William Salesbury - 
1550
William Salesbury

 

1556
Robert Recorde - 
1559
Humphrey Llwyd - Cronica Walliae
1564
John Dee - Monas Hieroglyphica 
1567
Gruffydd Robert - 
William Salesbury - , 2nd edn
William Salesbury - translations into Welsh
 (the New Testament; the first published Bible translation into Welsh (7 October), from the Greek)
 (the Book of Common Prayer)
1568
Maurice Clenock -  (printed in Milan)
1573
Sir John Prys -  (published posthumously)
1584
David Powel - Historie of Cambria
c.1586-7
"G.R. of Milan" (Gruffydd Robert or perhaps Robert Gwyn (c.1540/50-1592/1604)) - Y Drych Cristianogawl (first part; the first book printed in Wales, on the clandestine Catholic press on the Little Orme, with a false imprint of "Rouen, 1585")
1587
Morris Kyffin - 
1589
John Penry -  
1594
Morris Kyffin - 
1595
 - 
1600
Robert Holland - 
William Vaughan - Golden Grove

Births
1504
date unknown - William Glyn, bishop (died 1558)
1505
date unknown - Rowland Meyrick, bishop (died 1566)
1510
approximate date - Thomas Phaer, lawyer, paediatrician and translator (died 1560)
1511
1 January - Henry, Duke of Cornwall, son of King Henry VIII of England and Catherine of Aragon and prospective Prince of Wales (died 23 February of the same year)
approximate date - Thomas Davies, Bishop of St Asaph (died 1573)
1512
approximate date - Robert Recorde, mathematician (died 1558)
1515
approximate date - Thomas Parry, Comptroller of the Household of Queen Elizabeth I of England (died 1560)
1527
13 July - John Dee, mathematician and occultist (died 1609)
1528
6 November - Gabriel Goodman, founder of Ruthin School (died 1601)
7 November - John Perrot, Lord Deputy of Ireland (died 1592)
1534
date unknown - Henry Herbert, 2nd Earl of Pembroke, statesman (died 1601)
1546
date unknown - Thomas Morgan (of Llantarnam), conspirator (died 1606)
1558
Richard Trevor, politician (died 1638)
1560
date unknown - Hugh Myddelton, goldsmith and hydraulic engineer (died 1631)
1565
date unknown - Peter Mutton, politician and judge (died 1637)
1572
Thomas Tomkins, composer (died 1656)
1575
9 December - Augustine Baker, Benedictine mystic (died 1641)
date unknown - William Vaughan, writer and colonial investor (died 1641)
1582
22 March - John Williams, Archbishop of York (died 1650)
1587
24 June - William Arnold, Welsh-descended American settler
1592
date unknown - Sir Owen Wynn, 3rd Baronet (died 1660)

Deaths
1500
1 October - John Alcock, Tudor supporter and Lord President of the Council of Wales and the Marches
1502
2 April - Arthur, Prince of Wales, 15
1503
date unknown
Richard Amerike, English merchant, royal customs officer and sheriff, of Welsh descent
Sir John Donne, courtier, diplomat and soldier, commissioner of the Donne Triptych
1505
date unknown - Sir Thomas Salusbury, Tudor supporter
1509
21 April - King Henry VII, Pembroke-born King of England, 52
29 June - Lady Margaret Beaufort, widow of Edmund Tudor and mother of King Henry VII, 66
1510
date unknown - Rhys Fawr ap Maredudd, Welsh nobleman and Tudor adherent
1512
12 February - David ap Owen, Bishop of St Asaph
1513
approximate date - Rhys Nanmor, poet
1514
3 April - Sir Thomas Englefield, Welsh landowner and Speaker of the House of Commons
1521
date unknown - Gruffydd ap Rhys ap Thomas, nobleman
1525
Spring - Sir Rhys ap Thomas, Tudor supporter, 75?
1526
15 April - Charles Somerset, 1st Earl of Worcester, also Lord Herbert, 65/66
1531
July - Sir Matthew Craddock, Steward of Gower and Seneschal of Kenfig 
1537
October - Lady Catherine Gordon, widow of Sir Matthew Craddock, about 63 (buried at St Mary's Church, Swansea)
1543
28 January - Rowland Lee, Lord President of the Council of Wales and the Marches
1549
26 November - Henry Somerset, 2nd Earl of Worcester
1554
18 May - William Thomas (executed)
24 December - 80 "red-headed bandits of Mawddach" (executed)
1555
March (probable) - Rawlins White, fisherman, 70? (executed by burning at Cardiff)
30 March - Robert Ferrar, former Bishop of St David's (executed by burning at Carmarthen)
15 October - Sir John Prys, notary public to King Henry VIII, 53?
15 November - Robert Holgate, former Bishop of Llandaff
1558
9 April - William Nichol, Protestant martyr
21 May - William Glyn, bishop
date unknown - Robert Recorde, mathematician
1559
10 April - Sir Rice Mansel, admiral
1560
12 August - Thomas Phaer, paediatrician and politician (b. c.1510)
15 December - Sir Thomas Parry (b. c.1515)
1564
date unknown - Gruffudd Hiraethog, poet
1570
March–July - Sir Richard Clough, merchant
17 March - William Herbert, 1st Earl of Pembroke
1574
August - Hugh Price, lawyer
1581
7 November - Richard Davies, bishop
date unknown - Maurice Clenock, Recusant author
1584
27 April - David Lewis, lawyer, founder of Jesus College, Oxford
15 October - Richard Gwyn, Catholic martyr, 47
probable - William Salesbury, translator of the New Testament into Welsh
1585
2 March - William Parry, conspirator (executed)
1586
5 May - Henry Sidney, President of the Council of Wales, 56
20 September - Thomas Salisbury, conspirator (executed), 22?
date unknown - Griffith Lloyd, Principal of Jesus College, Oxford
1589
21 February - William Somerset, 3rd Earl of Worcester
1590
12 February - Blanche Parry, gentlewoman to Queen Elizabeth I, 81?
1591
27 August - Katheryn of Berain, much-married heiress, 56
15 October - William Blethyn, Bishop of Llandaff
1592
3 November - Sir John Perrot, Lord Deputy of Ireland, 63
1593
29 May - John Penry, Protestant martyr, 33
1595
12 December - Roger Williams, soldier of fortune, 55?
date unknown - Meurig Dafydd, poet, about 85
1596
October - Richard Herbert, politician and judge
date unknown - Wiliam Midleton, poet, about 46
1597
3 August - Richard Meredith, Bishop of Leighlin, 47?
1598
2 January - Morris Kyffin, soldier and author, 43?
12 July - John Jones, Catholic martyr
4 August - William Cecil, 1st Baron Burghley, politician of Welsh descent

References